The Wellesley Symphony Orchestra is an amateur American orchestra based in Wellesley, Massachusetts.  It has presented classical, pops, and family concerts since 1948.  The Music Director is Max Hobart.

The Wellesley Symphony Performs primarily classical works, presenting six concerts each season, including a family concert, with players from the Wellesley Public Schools, and a holiday pops concert.  Soloists have included players from the Boston Symphony Orchestra and well known musicians from the Boston area.

The Wellesley Symphony is Orchestra-in-Residence at MassBay Community College. The WSO supports young artists through its Young Soloist Competition, the winners of which are featured at the annual family concert.

References

External links 
Wellesley Symphony Orchestra website

Wellesley, Massachusetts
Musical groups established in 1948
Orchestras based in Massachusetts